Elections to the Philippine Legislature were held on June 5, 1928 pursuant to the Philippine Organic Act of 1902 which prescribed elections for every three years. Votes elected 94 members of the House of Representatives in the 1928 Philippine House of Representatives elections; and 24 members of the Senate in the 1928 Philippine Senate elections.

1928
1928 elections in Asia
1928 in the Philippines